Pteroplatus is a genus of beetles in the family Cerambycidae, containing the following species:

 Pteroplatus anchora Belon, 1903
 Pteroplatus arrogans Buquet, 1840
 Pteroplatus atroviolaceus Kirsch, 1889
 Pteroplatus bilineatus Buquet, 1841
 Pteroplatus dimidiatipennis Buquet, 1841
 Pteroplatus elegans Buquet, 1841
 Pteroplatus fasciatus Buquet, 1841
 Pteroplatus gracilis Buquet, 1840
 Pteroplatus nigriventris Breme, 1844
 Pteroplatus pulcher Buquet, 1840
 Pteroplatus quadriscopulatus Bates, 1880
 Pteroplatus rostainei Buquet, 1840
 Pteroplatus suturalis Buquet, 1840
 Pteroplatus transversalis Breme, 1844
 Pteroplatus variabilis Sallé, 1849

References

Pteroplatini